Wappinger Creek is a  creek which runs from Thompson Pond to the Hudson River at New Hamburg in Dutchess County, New York, United States. It is the longest creek in Dutchess County, with the largest watershed in the county.

Overview 

The creek flows in a north–south direction on the eastern side of the Hudson River.  The creek's source is Thompson Pond near Pine Plains, and it heads southwestward towards its mouth in the Hudson River near New Hamburg. Along the way, it goes through fluctuations in width and follows an erratic path.  The initial  of the creek runs through rocky, steep, wooded terrain. However, as it approaches the Hudson it enters the river's tidal range, and has sandbars, mudflats and marshes. The creek is also home to numerous species, and is an important spawning area for anadromous fish, which thrive in the creek between April and June. Largemouth bass,
bluegill, pumpkinseed, red-breasted sunfish, and brown bullhead, however, are resident species. Also, the creek is annually stocked with various species of trout for the purpose of recreational fishing.

In Wappingers Falls, the creek forms Wappinger Lake, a man-made reservoir.

Some residents and maps such as the 1867 Dutchess County Atlas refer to the creek as the Wappingers, as does the New York State Department of Environmental Conservation, the National Weather Service, and the Hudson River Riverkeeper.

Tributaries
Wappinger Creek has four distinct tributaries; the longest of which is Little Wappinger Creek which enters the creek from the east bank.

The tributaries are listed below from the source to the mouth, with Hunns Lake Creek being the northernmost and Little Wappinger Creek being the southernmost.

See also 
 List of rivers in New York
 Mary Flagler Cary Arboretum: Wappinger Creek Trail

References

External links 
 Wappingers Creek water level

Rivers of New York (state)
Rivers of Dutchess County, New York
Wappinger, New York
Poughkeepsie, New York
Tributaries of the Hudson River